Tancred of Hauteville (c. 980 – 1041) was an 11th-century Norman petty lord about whom little is known. He was a minor noble near Coutances in the Cotentin. Tancred is also known by the achievements of his twelve sons.

Various legends arose about Tancred which have no supporting contemporary evidence that has survived the ages.

Ancestors
The Hauteville family was said by later traditions to descend from Hiallt, a Norseman active in 920, who is credited with founding the village of Hialtus Villa (Hauteville) in the Cotentin of Normandy. Tancred is a supposed descendant of Hiallt, from whom the village of Hauteville and the family drew their name. This cannot be identified with certainty, and some modern scholarship favours Hauteville-la-Guichard over Hauteville in Cotentin.

Family and descendants
With his two wives, he had twelve sons and several daughters, almost all of whom left Normandy for Southern Italy and acquired some prominence there. 

With his first wife, Muriella, he had five sons and one daughter:
Serlo (stayed in Normandy)
Beatrix (d. 1101), married first to Armand de Mortain, son of Robert, Count of Eu, and second to a Roger (family unknown)
Geoffrey, lord of Hauteville, count of Loritello (d. 1063)
William Iron Arm, count of Apulia and Calabria (d. 1046)
Drogo, count of Apulia and Calabria (d. 1051)
Humphrey, count of Apulia and Calabria (d. 1057)

According to the Italian chronicler of the Norman feats in the south, Amatus of Montecassino, Tancred was a morally upright man, who would not carry on a sinful relationship and being unable also to live out his life in perfect celibacy, he remarried.

With his second wife, Fressenda (or Fredesenda), he had seven more sons and at least one daughter:
Robert Guiscard de Hauteville, count of Apulia and Calabria (1057), then duke of Apulia, Calabria and Sicily (d. 1085)
Mauger, (d. 1064), count of the Capitanate (part of the Province of Foggia, within Apulia) 
William, count of the Principate (d. 1080)
Aubrey (Alberic or Alvared, Alveredus in Latin, sometimes called Alvred or Alfred) (stayed in Normandy)
Humbert (Hubert) (stayed in Normandy)
Tancred (stayed in Normandy)
Roger de Hauteville, count of Sicily from 1062 (d. 1101)
Fressenda, who married Richard I (dead in 1078), count of Aversa and prince of Capua

Other Tancred of Hauteville
Tancred's great-grandson, also bearing the same name, Tancred, Prince of Galilee, was a leader in the First Crusade. The line of descent was:
Tancred the elder
son Robert Guiscard (Duke Robert d'Hauteville)
granddaughter Emma of Hauteville
great-grandson Tancred of Hauteville, who became Prince of Galilee and regent of the Principality of Antioch

References

11th-century Normans
980s births
1041 deaths
Tancred

Year of birth uncertain